Ruby Wilson (February 29, 1948 – August 12, 2016) was an American blues and gospel singer and actress. She was known as "The Queen of Beale Street" as she sang in clubs on Beale Street, Memphis, Tennessee, for over 40 years. She had a successful touring and recording career, and appeared in a number of films.

Early life
Wilson was born in Fort Worth, Texas, United States, the youngest in a family of six children. Her mother was a maid, her father was self-employed, and Wilson grew up picking and chopping cotton - work she later described as hot and unpleasant.

Wilson's upbringing was filled with music, from two quite different sources - her mother, a deeply religious woman, only allowed her children to listen to gospel music, as she believed that all other music was "the devil's music". Wilson's mother was the choir director at their family church, and when she was 7 years old Wilson began singing in her mother's choir. On the other hand, Wilson's father loved blues and Wilson listened with him to blues musicians, which had a strong influence on her future career.

Wilson met B.B. King for the first time when she was 14; King offered to be her godfather, and the two became close. When she was 15 years old, singer Shirley Caesar heard Wilson singing at church and invited her to tour with her as a backing singer. The following year, Wilson moved to Chicago, where she became a church choir director and sang gospel. She later returned to Texas and started singing jazz.

Career
Wilson moved to Memphis, Tennessee, in 1972, and started working as a kindergarten teacher in the Memphis City School system. She also began performing regularly in clubs on Beale Street, including The Peabody, Club Handy and Club Royale, with musicians such as Ray Charles, Isaac Hayes, and the Four Tops. When B.B. King opened his B.B. King's Blues Club, she was given a weekly residency there, and when he later opened a restaurant, Itta Bena, she also became a regular performer there.

As Wilson's career developed, she toured the United States and internationally, and performed at blues and jazz festivals in Europe, Asia and New Zealand. She performed at the New Orleans Jazz & Heritage Festival, and for President Clinton and Vice-President Gore, Queen Elizabeth II and Prince Rainier III of Monaco and his son Prince Albert. Wilson also performed on cruise ships and river cruises, and at parties and corporate events. Some of the bands which she performed with were the Hot Cotton Jazz Band, Buck Bubbles Express, the Unknown Band, the King Beez, B. B. King All Stars, Ms. Ruby’s Band and the Detroit People’s Band.

In the 1980s, Wilson spent some years living in Los Angeles and performed with Joan Rivers and Sharon Gless.

In 1976 she was offered her first record contract, with Malaco Records. Her first album, Ruby Wilson, was released by Malaco in 1981, and she released a further nine albums in her career. Two, Cake Walking Babies (1988) and Outstanding In Their Field (1989) were recorded with the Hot Cotton Jazz Band.

Film appearances
Wilson appeared in several films, including The People vs. Larry Flynt (1996), The Chamber (1996), Cookie's Fortune (1999) and Black Snake Moan (2006) as well as in television commercials.

Recognition and honors
In 1992, after 20 years of singing in Beale Street clubs, local TV station WMC-TV gave her the title "Queen Ambassador of Beale Street"; two years later this was amended to "The Queen of Beale Street".

In 2006, Wilson received the Memphis Sound Award for Best Entertainer; in 2010, she was inducted into the Black Business Directory's African-American Hall of Fame.

In 2012, Wilson was offered space to exhibit items from her career, and later that year the Ruby Wilson Museum was opened. It displays memorabilia including awards, outfits and photographs. In 2013, Wilson received a W.C. Handy Heritage Awards Lifetime Achievement Award.

The Beale Street Walk of Fame includes a brass note recognising Wilson's contribution to the street's music.

Personal life
Wilson was married four times. Her first husband was a gospel entertainer from Chicago. Her fourth  husband was B.B. King's road manager.

Later years and death
Wilson suffered a stroke in 2009, and was unable to speak for four months. She received speech therapy and physical therapy and eventually recovered enough to return to acting and singing. She suffered a heart attack in 2016, and after several days in a coma died on August 12, aged 68.

She was survived by four children, twelve grandchildren, and five great-grandchildren.

References

External links
 

1948 births
2016 deaths
20th-century American singers
21st-century American singers
20th-century African-American women singers
American blues singers
American gospel singers
People from Fort Worth, Texas
Singers from Texas
20th-century American women singers
21st-century American women singers
Malaco Records artists
21st-century African-American women singers